Patrick Joseph McDonald (27 March 1897 – 30 January 1965) was an Australian rules footballer who played for  in the Victorian Football League (VFL).

Family
The son of John Thomas McDonald (1863-1929), and Margaret Mary McDonald (1860-1936), née O'Brien, Patrick Joseph McDonald, known as "Paddy", was born at Allendale, Victoria on 27 March 1897.

He married Eileen Neville (1898-1976) in 1923.

Football
He played his final VFL match in 1919 having played 9 matches. His brother Frank McDonald also played for Essendon.

Footnotes

References
 Maplestone, M., Flying Higher: History of the Essendon Football Club 1872–1996, Essendon Football Club, (Melbourne), 1996.

External links
 

1897 births
Essendon Football Club players
Australian rules footballers from Victoria (Australia)
1965 deaths
People from Creswick, Victoria